The 1955 U.S. National Championships (now known as the US Open) was a tennis tournament that took place on the outdoor grass courts at the West Side Tennis Club, Forest Hills in New York City, United States. The tournament ran from 2 September until 11 September. It was the 75th staging of the U.S. National Championships, and the fourth Grand Slam tennis event of the year.

Finals

Men's singles

 Tony Trabert (USA) defeated  Ken Rosewall (AUS) 9–7, 6–3, 6–3

Women's singles

 Doris Hart (USA) defeated  Patricia Ward (GBR) 6–4, 6–2

Men's doubles
 Kosei Kamo (JPN) /  Atsushi Miyagi (JPN) defeated  Gerald Moss (USA) /  Bill Quillian (USA) 6–2, 6–3, 3–6, 1–6, 6–4

Women's doubles
 Louise Brough (USA) /  Margaret Osborne duPont (USA) defeated  Shirley Fry (USA) /  Doris Hart (USA) 6–3, 1–6, 6–3

Mixed doubles
 Doris Hart (USA) /  Vic Seixas (USA) defeated  Shirley Fry (USA) /  Gardnar Mulloy (USA) 7–5, 5–7, 6–2

References

External links
Official US Open website

 
U.S. National Championships
U.S. National Championships (tennis) by year
U.S. National Championships
U.S. National Championships
U.S. National Championships